Double Seventh Festival（七夕）refers to the Qixi Festival in China.

Double Seventh Festival may also refer to: 

Chilseok in Korea
Tanabata in Japan